José Jadílson dos Santos Silva (born December 4, 1977 in Maceió, Alagoas), most commonly known as Jadílson, is a Brazilian football defender.

Club statistics

Honours

Goiás
Campeonato Goiano: 2006

São Paulo
Campeonato Brasileiro Série A: 2007

Cruzeiro
Campeonato Mineiro: 2008

Personal Honours
Brazilian Silver Ball (Placar) - Best Left Back: 2005

References

External links

 globoesporte.globo.com
 CBF
 sambafoot
 saopaulofc.net

1977 births
Living people
Brazilian footballers
Brazilian expatriate footballers
Expatriate footballers in Japan
Campeonato Brasileiro Série A players
Campeonato Brasileiro Série B players
J1 League players
Clube de Regatas Brasil players
Associação Portuguesa de Desportos players
Botafogo Futebol Clube (SP) players
Guarani FC players
Hokkaido Consadole Sapporo players
Fluminense FC players
Paraná Clube players
Goiás Esporte Clube players
São Paulo FC players
Cruzeiro Esporte Clube players
Grêmio Foot-Ball Porto Alegrense players
Grêmio Barueri Futebol players
Association football defenders
Sportspeople from Alagoas